Ian Winterbottom, Baron Winterbottom (6 April 1913 – 4 July 1992), was a Labour Party politician in the United Kingdom.

He was educated at Charterhouse School and Clare College, Cambridge.

He was elected at the 1950 general election as the Member of Parliament (MP) for Nottingham Central, a marginal constituency which the sitting Labour MP Geoffrey de Freitas had abandoned for the promising Lincoln seat.

He held the seat at the 1951 general election with a majority of only 139 votes, but lost it at the 1955 election to the Conservative candidate John Cordeaux. He contested Nottingham Central again at the 1959 general election, but Cordeaux held the seat with an increased majority.

He did not contest the 1964 election, when Labour returned to government under Harold Wilson, but was created a life peer on 14 May 1965, as Baron Winterbottom, of Clopton in the County of Northampton. After Labour's victory at the 1966 general election, he joined the Labour Government, serving as Under-Secretary of State for the Navy until 1967, as Parliamentary Secretary to the Ministry of Public Building and Works from 1967 to 1968 and finally as Under-Secretary of State for the Air Force from 1968 until the government's defeat at the 1970 general election.

In 1981 he joined the Social Democratic Party (SDP) as a founder member. In his Who's Who entry he described himself as "latterly a Conservative". He died in 1992, aged 79.

References

Resources 
Richard Kimber's Political Science Resources: UK General Elections since 1832

External links 
 

1913 births
1992 deaths
People educated at Charterhouse School
Alumni of Clare College, Cambridge
Labour Party (UK) life peers
Social Democratic Party (UK) life peers
Labour Party (UK) MPs for English constituencies
UK MPs 1950–1951
UK MPs 1951–1955
UK MPs who were granted peerages
Ministers in the Wilson governments, 1964–1970
Life peers created by Elizabeth II